Nizhneingashsky District is an administrative and municipal district (raion), one of the forty-three in Krasnoyarsk Krai, Russia. It is located in the southeast of the krai and borders Abansky District in the north, Irkutsk Oblast in the east and southeast, and Ilansky District in the south and west. Its administrative center is the urban locality (an urban-type settlement) of Nizhny Ingash. As of the 2010 Census, the total population of the district was 33,439, with the population of Nizhny Ingash accounting for 22.7% of that number.

History
The district was founded on April 4, 1924.

Government
As of 2015–2020, the Head of the district  is Pyotr A. Malyshkin.

Economy

Transportation
The Trans-Siberian Railway runs through the district from west to east. A part of the federal highway M53 passes through the district as well.

References

Notes

Sources

Districts of Krasnoyarsk Krai
States and territories established in 1924